KEMR (102.1 FM) was a radio station licensed to Castle Dale, Utah, United States. The station was owned by College Creek Media, LLC.

On September 30, 2013, the Federal Communications Commission (FCC) notified the licensee that the station's license had expired effective July 6, 2012, due to the station having been silent for the preceding twelve months. The FCC simultaneously deleted the KEMR call sign from their data base.

References

External links
 

EMR
Defunct radio stations in the United States
Radio stations disestablished in 2013
2013 disestablishments in Utah
EMR
EMR